Mystery Ship may refer to:

 Travel Air Type R Mystery Ship, an early model of racing airplane
 The Mystery Ship, a 1917 serial adventure film
 Vetter Mystery Ship, a limited-edition motorcycle from 1980
 Mystery Ship (film), a 1941 American film by Columbia Pictures
  Q-ship, a type of armored merchant ship
  Mystery airship, a 19th-century term for an unidentified flying object

See also 
 Mary Celeste, an 1861 sailing vessel found mysteriously abandoned at sea
 "Ride Captain Ride", a 1970 popular song that features the phrase in its refrain